César Salazar may refer to:

 César Salazar (cyclist) (born 1972), road racing cyclist from Colombia, who also holds Venezuelan nationality
 César Salazar (squash player) (born 1988), Mexican squash player